Eri Hozumi and Moyuka Uchijima were the defending champions  but chose to participate with different partners. Hozumi partnered Mana Ayukawa, but lost in the first round to Wu Fang-hsien and Zhang Ying.

Uchijima played alongside Erina Hayashi and successfully defended the title, defeating Hsieh Yu-chieh and Minori Yonehara in the final, 7–5, 5–7, [10–6].

Seeds

Draw

Draw

References

External links
Main Draw

Shimadzu All Japan Indoor Tennis Championships - Doubles
All Japan Indoor Tennis Championships